Patrick Süskind (born 26 March 1949) is a German writer and screenwriter, known best for his novel Perfume: The Story of a Murderer, first published in 1985.

Early life
Süskind was born in Ambach, Bavaria. His father was writer and journalist Wilhelm Emanuel Süskind, who worked for the newspaper Süddeutsche Zeitung and is famous as the co-author of the well-known publication Aus dem Wörterbuch des Unmenschen (From the Dictionary of an Inhuman), a critical collection of essays concerning the language of the Nazi era. Patrick Süskind went to school in Holzhausen, a small Bavarian village. His mother worked as a sports trainer; his older brother Martin E. Süskind is also a journalist. Süskind has many relatives from the aristocracy in Württemberg, making him one of the descendants of the exegete Johann Albrecht Bengel and of the reformer Johannes Brenz.

After his qualification testing for university and his mandatory community service, he studied medieval and modern history at the University of Munich and in Aix-en-Provence from 1968–1974, but never graduated. Funded by his parents, he relocated to Paris, where he wrote "mainly short, unpublished fiction and longer screenplays which were not made into films".

Work
During 1981, he had his first major success with the play Der Kontrabaß (The Double Bass), which was conceived originally as a radio play. During the theatrical season of 1984–85, the play was performed more than 500 times. The only role is that of a tragi-comical orchestra musician. During the 1980s, Süskind was also successful as a screenwriter for the television productions Monaco Franze (1983) and Kir Royal (1987), among others. He rejected other awards, like the FAZ-Literaturpreis, the Toucan Prize, and the Gutenbergpreis.

His best-known work is the internationally acclaimed bestseller Perfume: The Story of a Murderer (1985). Perfume was on the bestselling list of the German weekly news magazine Der Spiegel for nine years. It was adapted into a film directed by Tom Tykwer. Süskind is also the author of a novella, The Pigeon (1988), The Story of Mr Sommer (1991, illustrated by French cartoonist Sempe), Three Stories and a Reflection (1996), and a collection of essays, On Love and Death (2006).

Personal life 
Süskind lives as a recluse in Munich, in Seeheim (on Lake Starnberg), and in France at Montolieu. The public knows little about him; he has withdrawn from literary society and does not grant interviews or allow himself to be photographed.

Selected works
 Der Kontrabaß (The Double Bass) (play, 1981)
 Das Parfum (Perfume: The Story of a Murderer) (novel, 1985)
 Die Taube (The Pigeon) (novella, 1988)
 Die Geschichte von Herrn Sommer (The Story of Mr Sommer) (novella, 1991)
 Drei Geschichten und eine Betrachtung (Three Stories and a Reflection) (stories, 1996) [Contents: Depth Wish, A Battle, Maître Mussard's Bequest, Amnesia in Litteris.]
 Über Liebe und Tod (On Love and Death) (essay, 2006)

References

Further reading
Delseit, Wolfgang and Drost, Ralf. Patrick Süskind. Das Parfum. Erläuterungen und Dokumente. Stuttgart: Reclam 2000.

External links
 The Literary Encyclopedia page for Patrick Süskind
 Smee, Jess. "Critics sniffy over Perfume, the 'unfilmable' film", The Guardian, 8 September 2006.
 The book doesn't smell either"]: Dietmar Kammerer interviews director Tom Tykwer, at Sign and Sight'', 20 September 2006 (originally appeared in German in [http://www.taz.de/pt/2006/09/14/a0192.1/text Die Tageszeitung on 14 September 2006).
 

 
1949 births
Living people
20th-century German novelists
21st-century German novelists
Magic realism writers
People from Bad Tölz-Wolfratshausen
Ludwig Maximilian University of Munich alumni
World Fantasy Award-winning writers
German male novelists
20th-century German male writers
21st-century German male writers